Mary Moss (September 24, 1864 – April 2, 1914) was an American author and literary critic.

Biography
Mary Moss was born in Philadelphia to Dr. William Moss and Mary Noronha. She was a member an old and prominent Philadelphia Jewish family. Her great-grandfather was businessman Hyman Levy, in whose fur store John Jacob Astor was an apprentice. During the American Civil War, her father served as a private soldier in the 16st Pennsylvania Volunteers and as a surgeon in the 6th Pennsylvania Cavalry Regiment. She was educated at a private school in Chestnut Hill.

In 1900 Moss began writing for the Philadelphia Times and the Philadelphia Press, to which she contributed sketches on the Yiddish theater and other subjects. From 1902 she was a prolific contributor of fiction and essays to various magazines. Her Jewish novel Julian Meldohla appeared in Lippincott's Magazine in 1903. Besides two other novels, Fruit Out of Season (1902) and A Sequence in Hearts (1903), she contributed short stories and essays to the Atlantic Monthly, McClure's Magazine, The Bookman, Ainslee's Magazine, and Scribner's Magazine.

On her success as an author, Moss said of herself:

She died at the Rindone Hospital in Catania, Sicily, several weeks after falling suddenly ill with a brain tumor.

Selected publications
 
 
 
 
 
  Illustrated by May Wilson Preston.
 
 
  Illustrated by Karl Anderson.
 
 
 
  Illustrated by Charlotte Weber.
 
 
 
  Illustrated by May Wilson Preston.

References
 

1864 births
1914 deaths
20th-century American Jews
Deaths from brain cancer in Italy
Jewish American novelists
Jewish American short story writers
Jewish women writers
Literary critics of English
Women literary critics
Writers from Philadelphia